ISO 3166-2:CF is the entry for the Central African Republic in ISO 3166-2, part of the ISO 3166 standard published by the International Organization for Standardization (ISO), which defines codes for the names of the principal subdivisions (e.g., provinces or states) of all countries coded in ISO 3166-1.

Currently for the Central African Republic, ISO 3166-2 codes are defined for 1 commune, 14 prefectures, and 2 economic prefectures. The commune Bangui is the capital of the country and has special status equal to the prefectures and economic prefectures.

Each code consists of two parts, separated by a hyphen. The second part is either of the following:
 two letters: prefectures and economic prefectures
 three letters: commune

Current codes
Subdivision names are listed as in the ISO 3166-2 standard published by the ISO 3166 Maintenance Agency (ISO 3166/MA).

ISO 639-1 codes are used to represent subdivision names in the following administrative languages:
 (fr): French
 (sg): Sango

Click on the button in the header to sort each column.

Changes
The following changes to the entry have been announced in newsletters by the ISO 3166/MA since the first publication of ISO 3166-2 in 1998:

See also
 Subdivisions of the Central African Republic
 FIPS region codes of the Central African Republic

External links
 ISO Online Browsing Platform: CF
 Prefectures of the Central African Republic, Statoids.com

2:CF
ISO 3166-2
Central African Republic geography-related lists